The CDAX is a German stock market index calculated by Deutsche Börse.  It is a composite index of all stocks traded on the Frankfurt Stock Exchange that are listed in the General Standard or Prime Standard market segments.

See also 
 DAX
 MDAX
 SDAX
 TecDAX

German stock market indices